Caladenia serotina, commonly known as the Christmas spider orchid, is a species of orchid endemic to the south-west of Western Australia. It has a single erect, hairy leaf and up to three white to cream-coloured and red flowers, although the relative amount of each is variable. It is one of the later-flowering spider orchids and occurs in the far south-west corner of the state.

Description 
The flowers have varying amounts of red and white or cream colours. The sepals and petals have long, thick, yellowish tips. The tip of the labellum is curled under and there are between four and eight rows of red, cream or white calli along the mid-line of the labellum. Flowering occurs from October to early January but is more prolific after fire the previous summer.

Taxonomy and naming 
Caladenia serotina was first formally described in 1992 by Stephen Hopper and Andrew Phillip Brown in Orchids of South-West Australia from a specimen collected near Manjimup but the description was not validly published. The description was validated by the same authors in a 2002 edition of Nuytsia. The specific epithet (serotina) is a Latin word meaning "happening late" referring to the late flowering of this orchid.

Distribution and habitat 
The Christmas spider orchid is found between Perth and Bremer Bay in the Esperance Plains, Jarrah Forest, Swan Coastal Plain and Warren biogeographic regions where it grows in winter-wet areas, sometimes flowering in shallow water.

Conservation
Caladenia serotina is classified as "not threatened" by the Western Australian Government Department of Parks and Wildlife.

References

serotina
Endemic orchids of Australia
Orchids of Western Australia
Plants described in 2002
Endemic flora of Western Australia
Taxa named by Stephen Hopper
Taxa named by Andrew Phillip Brown